"No Relief" is song and the debut single by Australian singer, Hannah. The song was released in April 2002 and peaked at number 18 on the ARIA charts.

The single was launched in April at M Restaurant.

Track listings
 CD single (Vibe Music Australia – VMA-H01)
 "No Relief"
 "No Relief" (Dance Mix)
 "No Relief" (R & B Mix)
 "Love Make the World Go Round"

Charts

References

2002 singles
2002 debut singles
2002 songs
Song articles with missing songwriters